Agounit (also transliterated Aghouinite, Aghounit, Aghoueinit, Agueinit, Agwenit, Agwanit, Agüenit, Aguanit; Arabic: أغوانيت) is a small town or village in the Río de Oro area of the disputed territory of Western Sahara. It is situated in the Polisario Front-held Free Zone of Western Sahara, under the jurisdiction of the Sahrawi Arab Democratic Republic, and near the Mauritanian border, 72 km. south-west from Fderik. It is claimed by Morocco as a rural commune in the Aousserd Province in the region of Dakhla-Oued Ed-Dahab. At the time of the 2004 census, the commune had a total population of 222 people living in 43 households. It has a hospital, a school and a mosque. It is the head of the 7th military region of the Sahrawi Arab Democratic Republic.

It is also the name of a daïra of the wilaya of Auserd, in the Sahrawi refugee camps.

Infrastructure
On June 7, 2006, and during the celebrations of the 30th anniversary of the "Day of the Martyr" (commemorating the death in combat of El-Ouali Mustapha Sayed, first president of the SADR), Mohamed Abdelaziz (president of the SADR) inaugurated a hospital (built up with help from the Basque country government), a desalination centre (built with the help of Andalusia government), a school and the Mayoralty of Agwenit.

Politics
In May 2000, the Polisario Front celebrated the 27th anniversary of the beginning of their armed struggle with a military parade in Agounit.

In June 2006 (during the celebrations of the 30th anniversary of the "Day of the Martyr") the town was the host of the annual conference of the Sahrawi communities abroad (Sahrawi diaspora).

International relations

Twin towns and sister cities
Agounit is twinned with:

 Amurrio, Álava, Basque Country, Spain
 Busturia, Biscay, Basque Country, Spain
 Campiglia Marittima, Livorno, Tuscany, Italy
 Gatika, Biscay, Basque Country, Spain
 Lapuebla de Labarca, Álava, Basque Country, Spain
 Mallabia, Biscay, Basque Country, Spain
 Motril, Granada, Andalucía, Spain
 Poggio a Caiano, Prato, Tuscany, Italy
 Ponsacco, Pisa, Tuscany, Italy
 Portoferraio, Livorno, Tuscany, Italy (since November 8, 2004)
 Puçol, Valencia, Comunidad Valenciana, Spain (since September 1, 2002)
 Quarrata, Pistoia, Tuscany, Italy
 Rignano sull'Arno, Florence, Tuscany, Italy
 Tres Cantos, Madrid, Spain (since 1995)

References

External links
 1970's black and white photos of the Spanish hospital in Agüenit

Sahrawi Arab Democratic Republic
Populated places in Western Sahara
Populated places in Aousserd Province